Jules Huot (January 7, 1908 – February 2, 1999) was a French-Canadian professional golfer.

Huot was born in Boischatel, Quebec and was the most successful member of a large golfing family, with brothers Rodolphe and Roland also enjoying provincial and national success. He served as the head professional at several golf clubs in Quebec, most notably at Kent Golf Club for almost 15 years and then at Le Club Laval-suc-le-lac, where he remained for 25 years until his retirement in 1970.

Huot had a successful tournament career, highlighted by winning the General Brock Open on the PGA Tour – the first Canadian professional to win on the tour, and Canadian PGA Championship on three occasions, in 1934, 1939 and 1946. Amongst others, he also won the open championships of Ontario and Quebec. He played in the Masters Tournament on three occasions, in 1935, 1936 and 1940, with a best finish of tied-33rd in his final appearance. He also represented Canada internationally, including at the 1954 Canada Cup and in the Hopkins Trophy every year from 1952 to 1955.

Huot has been widely recognised for his achievement and contributions to golf, highlighted by his induction into the Canadian Golf Hall of Fame in 1977, and the Canada's Sports Hall of Fame in 1978. He has also been inducted into the halls of fame of the PGA of Canada and Quebec Golf, and had streets named after him in Montréal and Chicoutimi.

Professional wins

PGA Tour (1)

Other wins
 1932 Quebec Spring Open
 1934 Canadian PGA Championship, Quebec Open
 1935 Quebec Spring Open
 1939 Canadian PGA Championship
 1945 Quebec Open
 1946 Canadian PGA Championship, Quebec PGA Championship
 1947 Quebec PGA Championship
 1951 Quebec Spring Open
 1952 Quebec Spring Open
 1955 Ontario Open, Quebec PGA Championship
 1958 Quebec Open, Quebec PGA Championship
 1959 Quebec PGA Championship

Results in major championships

Note: Huot only played in the Masters Tournament.

"T" indicates a tie for a place

Team appearances
Canada Cup (representing Canada): 1954
Hopkins Trophy: 1952, 1953, 1954, 1955

References

External links
 Jules Huot at the Canada's Sports Hall of Fame website
 Jules Huot at the Canadian Golf Hall of Fame website
 Jules Huot at the PGA of Canada Hall of Fame website
 Jules Huot at the Golf Quebec website

Canadian male golfers
Golfing people from Quebec
French Quebecers
People from Capitale-Nationale
1908 births
1999 deaths